Dornum is a village and a municipality in the East Frisian district of Aurich, in Lower Saxony, Germany. It is situated near the North Sea coast, approx. 15 km east of Norden, and 20 km north of Aurich.

Division of the municipality
The other towns in the municipality of Dornum are: Neßmersiel, Dornumersiel, Nesse, Roggenstede, Westerbur, Westeraccum, Schwittersum.

Notable places
Dornum is home to the Lutheran St. Bartholomaeus Church. Bartholomaeus church contains an organ built by Gerhard von Holy. The organ is now considered a national treasure. 

Dornum also houses the only surviving building of a synagogue in East Frisia. The synagogue was deconsecrated and sold on November 7, 1938 for 600 Reichsmarks to the neighboring master carpenter August Tessmer, who used it as a storeroom from then on. Nevertheless, on  Kristallnacht the windows of the building were smashed, the remaining furnishings were taken out of the building and burned on the market square. Sturmabteilung troops arrested all the Jewish residents of the town that night and took them to neighboring Norden, where other Jews from the district were also rounded up. Old people, women and children were released on the morning of November 10, the men were deported to Sachsenhausen concentration camp, from which they only returned weeks later. In the period that followed, the last Jews tried, as far as they were able, to leave Dornum or Germany. On September 13, 1939, 8 Jewish fellow citizens were still living in Dornum.

The receiving terminal for gas through Europipe I and II lies at Dornum. The gas is transported on from here through a 48-kilometre pipeline to Emden for quality and volume metering. From here the gas is routed to customers’ gas grids. The Czech Republic and Austria receive gas through Europipe II at Dornum. The Czechs take over the gas here for onward transport via the German St Katerina gas grid, at the German-Czech border. Austria takes over the gas at the German-Austrian border at Oberkappel.

Notable residents
Miene Schönberg (later known as Minnie Marx), was born in Dornum in 1865; she was the mother of the Marx brothers. Her brother Al Shean was likewise born in Dornum in 1868.

References

External links

 www.dornum.de 
 Pipe organ concert tour 

Towns and villages in East Frisia
Aurich (district)